Justice Surendra Kumar Yadav is currently the Deputy Lokayukta of Uttar Pradesh, was the special CBI judge in the Demolition of the Babri Masjid case. The Babri Masjid was demolished in Ayodhya on 6 December 1992, after which proceedings went on under a lengthy filing process. As a judge in the special CBI court, he gave the verdict in the  Demolition of the Babri Masjid case on 30 September 2020.

Life 
Yadav was born on September 10, 1959, in Pakhadpur village of Jaunpur of Uttar Pradesh. His father's name is Ram Krishna Yadav. After receiving the degree in Master of Law, he was selected for the Higher Judicial Service in the year 1990. And worked as Munsif, CJM, District Judge in many districts of Uttar Pradesh, he also gave the verdict in Babri Masjid demolition case as special CBI judge. He was appointed as the Deputy Lokayukta of Uttar Pradesh after his retirement in 2020.

References